Cariello is an Italian surname. Notable people with the surname include:

Alfredo Cariello (born 1979), Italian footballer
Dominic A. Cariello, American general
Mario J. Cariello (1907–1985), American lawyer, politician and judge
Sergio Cariello (born 1964), Brazilian-American comics artist

Italian-language surnames